Geraldine Halls (17 December 1919 – 27 October 1996) was an Australian mystery writer and novelist who sometimes wrote under the pseudonym Charlotte Jay, Jay being Halls's maiden name. One of the best and most singular authors of the suspense era , Halls wrote only nine crime books under the Charlotte Jay pseudonym, but their unorthodoxy earned her a place in mystery novel history .

It was under the name Charlotte Jay that Halls wrote most of the crime fiction novels for which she is most well known. She also wrote novels under her married name.

Life
Halls was born as Geraldine Mary Jay in Adelaide, South Australia on the 17 December 1919. She attended Girton School (now Pembroke School) and the University of Adelaide, and worked as a shorthand typist in Australia and England, and as a court stenographer in New Guinea, 1942–1950.

She married Albert Halls, an Oriental specialist, who worked with the United Nations Educational, Scientific and Cultural Organization (UNESCO). Albert Halls dealt in Oriental antiques in England and Australia. Marrying Albert enabled Halls to travel to many exotic locations in which she later included in her books. Only her first novel, The Knife is Feminine, is set in Australia. The other books are set in Pakistan, Japan, Thailand, England, Lebanon, India, Papua New Guinea and the Trobriand Islands.

After a long career in writing, Halls died on 27 October 1996, in her home town of Adelaide.

Awards
Halls's book Beat Not the Bones won the then newly created Edgar Allan Poe Award of the Mystery Writers' Association of America for Best Novel of the Year in 1954.

Adaptations
The crime novel, The Fugitive Eye was adapted for television for a drama series in 1961. The episode starred Charlton Heston and the series was hosted by Fred Astaire.

Works

Charlotte Jay novels
The Knife Is Feminine (1951)
Beat Not the Bones (1952)
The Fugitive Eye (1953)
The Yellow Turban (1955)
The Man Who Walked Away (US Title: The Stepfather)  (1958)
Arms for Adonis (1960)
A Hank of Hair (1964)

Geraldine Mary Jay novels
The Feast of the Dead (US Title: The Brink of Silence) (1956)

Geraldine Halls novels
The Cats of Benares (1967)
Cobra Kite (1971)
The Voice of the Crab (1974) 
The Last Summer of the Men Shortage (1977)
The Felling of Thawle : a novel (1979)
Talking to strangers : a novel (1982)
This is My Friend's Chair (1995)

References

Bibliography
Adelaide, Debra (1988) Australian women writers: a bibliographic guide, London, Pandora

1919 births
1996 deaths
20th-century Australian novelists
20th-century Australian women writers
Australian crime writers
Australian women novelists
Writers from Adelaide
Edgar Award winners
Women mystery writers
Pseudonymous women writers
20th-century pseudonymous writers